International Coalition to End Torture (commonly known as End Torture and ICET) is a non-governmental organisation focused on raising awareness of human rights and the United Nations Convention Against Torture around the world by knowing them, demanding them, and defending them. The objective of the organisation is to bring "like-minded individuals from all walks of life, all disciplines, races, creeds and nationalities and allied organizations to bring the full force of unity to bear in the human rights arena.

In 2003, Amnesty International launched a campaign called End Torture in Chinese language hoping that "the Chinese audience will view the website as a valuable resource to raise awareness about the need to prevent torture and ill-treatment; and to contribute to the campaign within China to stamp out torture once and for all." In 2003, International Coalition to End Torture was founded to reach a global audience as an independent non-profit organization. The International Coalition to End Torture draws attention to torture by governments and campaigns for compliance with international laws and standards. It works to mobilise public opinion to put pressure on governments that let torture take place.

Work 
The International Coalition to End Torture provides training on visiting places of detention; gives advice on the establishment and functioning of international prevention mechanisms; and advocates for legislative reform, ratification and implementation of relevant international treaties. The International Coalition to End Torture works in cooperation with a relatively broad variety of partners, who share its objectives, such as state authorities, police services, the judiciary, international human rights institutions, international  organisations and NGOs.

The International Coalition to End Torture assists in the drafting and implementation of international and  regional legal instruments to prevent torture. These include the UN Convention against Torture and its Optional Protocol (OPCAT); the  European Convention for the Prevention of Torture and the Robben Island  Guidelines for the Prohibition and Prevention of Torture in Africa.

Advocate for preventive mechanisms
The International Coalition to End Torture advocates and lobbies governments, national institutions, parliamentarians, NGOs, regional  bodies and the United Nations to establish and maintain effective  torture prevention mechanisms. The End Torture leads the campaign to ratify and  implement the OPCAT which establishes the first global system of  detention monitoring.

Strengthen capacities
The International Coalition to End Torture works with key national, regional and international actors to  strengthen their capacity to prevent torture. Specifically, the End Torture  advises states on how to establish and maintain independent visiting  bodies, trains national institutions and NGOs on monitoring places of  detention, trains the police and judiciary on legal norms and safeguards against torture, and provides advice on legislative reforms to better  prevent torture at national level.

Produce practical tools
The International Coalition to End Torture develops and disseminates practical tools to  prevent torture. These include a guide on monitoring places of detention, a manual on the provisions of the OPCAT, a training DVD on the UN treaty bodies, a toolkit to develop national preventive mechanisms and training course materials.

References

External links
 International Coalition to End Torture official site

Imprisonment and detention
International human rights organizations